Wai Lwin is a retired senior Myanmar Army officer, who served as the Minister of Defence from September 2012 to 13 August 2015. He previously served as a military representatives of Yangon Region Hluttaw. He is the Central Executive Committee member of the Union Solidarity and Development Party.

Biography
Wai Lwin was born on 4 November 1954 in Kyaunggon, Ayeyarwady Region.
He graduated in 1976 from the 16th intake of the Defence Services Academy.
He served as a former deputy commander of Yangon Region from 2003 to 2006 and as military commander of the Naypyidaw region from May 2006 to July 2012. In July 2012, he was appointed into the Yangon Region Hluttaw to replace Captain Lin Lin Kyaw, becoming the highest-ranked military member serving in a regional parliament.

He was on the EU blacklist from December 2003 until May 2012. Wai Lwin was temporarily suspended in August 2011 for suspicions of corruption and is a close associate of Than Shwe, former chairman of the State Peace and Development Council.

Wai Lwin is married to Swe Swe Oo, and the couple have children, namely Wai Phyo Aung, Wai Phyo, and Lwin Yamin.

References

1954 births
People from Ayeyarwady Region
Living people
Burmese generals
Defence ministers of Myanmar
Defence Services Academy alumni